Çerkes Ethem (1886 – 21 September 1948), known in English as Ethem the Circassian, was a Circassian Ottoman guerilla leader, social bandit, efe and soldier. He initially gained fame for establishing the Kuva-yi Seyyare and putting down multiple large-scale rebellions and gaining key major victories against the Greek armies invading Anatolia during the Turkish War of Independence.

In time, as Ethem's Islamic socialist views clashed with the Turkish nationalism of the Turkish National movement, he cut ties with them to act independently, and was later attacked and defeated by İsmet İnönü. İnönü later claimed that Ethem subsequently cooperated with the Greek army, a claim which has been rejected by Ethem himself and disputed by most historians.

Early life and family
His family, House of Dipsheu, was originally a famous pirate and bandit clan from the Ubykhia province of Circassia, who were exiled to Ottoman Empire in the 1860s during the Circassian genocide.

Ethem was born in the Emre village of Bandırma as the son of Psheu Ali Bey. One of his brothers was a Member of Parliament for Saruhan (present-day Manisa) in the Grand National Assembly of Turkey's first legislative term and previously in the fourth term of the Chamber of Deputies of the Ottoman Empire. His other brother was a senior military officer who graduated from the Turkish Military Academy in 1902.

Ethem the Circassian had blond hair, light blue eyes, and very pale skin, as described by Halide Edib Adıvar.  He stood at 2.00 m (6 ft 7 in) tall.

Education and military career
He ran away from home when he was 14 years old to join Bakırköy Cavalry Junior Officer School. He joined the Balkan War and was wounded on the Bulgarian front. As a result, he was awarded with honours and seniority allowance. Later he joined Teşkilat-ı Mahsusa organized by Eşref Kuşçubaşı and participated in operations in Afghanistan and Iraq during World War I. He was again wounded and retired to his village. He later founded Kuvâ-yi Seyyâre which was the only organized military force in Anatolia during 1919–1920 period between the Armistice of Mudros and the Treaty of Sèvres. He coordinated his military operations with Ali Fuat Paşa in Ankara and harassed the invading Greek armies with his fast cavalry. He was instrumental in putting down various rebellions against the authority of the Grand National Assembly of Turkey. Eventually Çerkes Ethem had a disagreement with İnönü, refusing to join his forces with the regular army established under the command of İnönü, as he would be a regular soldier as well. Ethem claimed that his soldiers made up of Circassians and mountain clans would never obey anyone other than him, and so he should be given the rank of commander in the army. Although Mustafa Kemal had a positive view of Ethem, İsmet Pasha did not like him, and so he was not taken seriously, and the newly reconstituted Turkish Army had to put down the situation whilst also fighting the Greeks at First Battle of İnönü. While Ethem's forces were clashing with Greeks, the Turkish army under the command of İnönü arrived, and Ethem, stuck between two hostile armies, made a non-aggression pact with the Greeks and fled Anatolia. İnönü later claimed that Ethem subsequently cooperated with the Greek army (a claim which has been disputed and rejected by most historians). This resulted in Ethem's citizenship getting revoked on the grounds of treason and his being declared persona non grata by the TBMM, amongst many others. From Greece, he went to Jordan and settled there.

Cooperation with Atatürk's forces against the Allied powers
Çerkes Ethem was an ally of Mustafa Kemal Atatürk who appreciated him for his successful fight against invading armies and bandits in different regions of Turkey. Atatürk awarded Ethem the Circassian with the title of Millî Kahraman (National Hero).

Kuva-yi Seyyare

The Kuvâ-yi Seyyâre was a force of Islamic socialist Circassian and Abkhazian volunteers, led by Ethem the Circassian against the allied invasion forces during the Turkish War of Independence. The group saw themselves as a force to fight against "those who caused disturbance to the greater good of Anatolia". The forces were a branch of the Kuva-yi Milliye, and played a big role in significantly slowing down the Greek army during the Greco-Turkish War (1919–1922).

Death and burial
Ethem Bey died on 21 September 1948 near River Jordan in Amman, Jordan. He was buried in the Circassian Cemetery.

Remembrance in literature 
In her 1928 work The Turkish Ordeal, the leading Ottoman female novelist and nationalist Halide Edib Adıvar mentions the first time she saw Ethem the Circassian and how respected he was by Mustafa Kemal Atatürk in addition to describing Ethem Bey's physical appearance in a very positive way.

Exhumation and reburial plans
In 2015, the deputy prime minister of Turkey  announced the planned exhumation and reburial of Ethem Bey in Turkey where he was born. This has not been carried out.

References

External links

1886 births
1948 deaths
Guerrillas
Members of Kuva-yi Milliye
Members of the Special Organization (Ottoman Empire)
Muslim socialists
Ottoman military personnel of the Balkan Wars
Ottoman military personnel of World War I
People from the Ottoman Empire of Circassian descent
People from Bandırma
Shapsugs
Turkish military personnel of the Greco-Turkish War (1919–1922)
Turkish people of Circassian descent
Turkish socialists